Eugnamptus is a genus of leaf and bud weevils in the beetle family Attelabidae. There are more than 170 described species in Eugnamptus.

See also
 List of Eugnamptus species

References

Further reading

External links

 

Attelabidae
Articles created by Qbugbot